Norðoyatunnilin (The Northern Isles Tunnel) is a two-lane road tunnel under the Leirvíksfjørður in the Faroe Islands. It connects the islands of Eysturoy and Borðoy. The tunnel is 6.2 km long and goes down to a depth of 150 metres below sea level. The maximum gradient is approximately 6 percent. The tunnel entrances are near the towns of Leirvík on Eysturoy, and Klaksvík on Borðoy. Until the Eysturoyartunnilin opened in December 2020, Norðoyatunnilin was the longest tunnel in the Faroe Islands.

History
In 1988 Landsverkfrøðingurin (the national office of public works) carried out a number of seismic investigations in Leirvíksfjørður (the strait between Eysturoy and Borðoy). A year earlier, an engineer had drawn up an overall plan showing alternative sites for constructing tunnels. Further surveys in 1988 confirmed that the tunnel plans were considered to be economically viable. In 2003, after the 1990s Faroese economic crisis, work began on boring the tunnel between Eysturoy and Borðoy. The official opening of the tunnel was on April 29, 2006. Traffic has steadily increased from 662,828 vehicles in 2007 to 1,308,519 in 2019 (3,585 per day). The project cost 395 million Danish kroner and is expected to be repaid by 2021.

See also

 List of tunnels of the Faroe Islands

References

External links
UF.fo - "Tunnel to Northern Islands now open for all Traffic" (archived version) (of May 3, 2006)
Tunnil.fo - Official homepage
The opening of Norðoyatunnilin April 29. 2006 

Tunnels in the Faroe Islands
Undersea tunnels in Europe
Tunnels completed in 2006
Road tunnels
2006 establishments in the Faroe Islands